Mary Fife Laning was an American painter and wife of artist Edward Laning.

Career
Mary Elizabeth Fife was born in 1898 or 1900 in Canton, Ohio.

In 1923, she earned a B.A. from the Carnegie Institute of Technology.  In 1925–1927, she did postgraduate work at Cooper Union.  In 1928, she studied at the Academie Russe in Paris.

From 1930 to 1935, she studied at the Art Students League under Kenneth Hayes Miller.  There she met her husband, Edward Laning, whom she married in 1933. The Lanings became part of the Miller circle with Reginald Marsh and Isabel Bishop.

The Lanings lived most of their lives in Brooklyn, New York.

In the 1940s, as a member of the National Association of Women Artists, Laning taught (with her husband) at the Kansas City Art Institute.

She survived her husband by a decade, dying in 1991.

Works
Fife's work has exhibited at the Butler Art Institute, Ohio, the Art Institute of Chicago, and the Whitney Museum of American Art.

Paintings include:
 Girl with Open Blouse (1925)
 Place in the Sun (1934)
 Forbidden Love (1935)
 The Lovers (1st Stoop) (1935)
 Klein's Dressing Room (1930s)
 Rocky Shore Newport RI (undated)
 Untitled (1946) Painting of Mary and her sisters in Greece.

Exhibitions included:
 Between Heaven and Hell
 Union Square in the 1930s
 New York Intaglio Figure, 1917 to 1954

References

External sources
 
 
Missouri Remembers Artists Portal

Year of birth uncertain
1991 deaths
Art Students League of New York alumni
20th-century American painters
Painters from Ohio
American women painters
Carnegie Mellon University alumni
Cooper Union alumni
Kansas City Art Institute faculty
20th-century American women artists
Treasury Relief Art Project artists
National Association of Women Artists members